Thomas Mutsch (born 2 April 1979) is a German racecar driver.

His first success was a third place in the 1993 German karting championship. Two years later, in 1995, Mutsch finished second in the Formula Renault 1800. In 1999, Mutsch reached second place in the Marlboro Masters of Formula 3, behind Briton Marc Hynes. He now competes in FIA GT and the FIA GT3 championship, driving for the Matech Ford Team in a Ford GT in both series.

Racing record

Complete GT1 World Championship results

24 Hours of Le Mans results

External links
Driver DB Profile

1979 births
Living people
Sportspeople from Trier
Racing drivers from Rhineland-Palatinate
German racing drivers
FIA GT Championship drivers
German Formula Three Championship drivers
German Formula Renault 2.0 drivers
FIA GT1 World Championship drivers
ADAC GT Masters drivers
24 Hours of Spa drivers
24H Series drivers

Josef Kaufmann Racing drivers
Van Amersfoort Racing drivers
Nürburgring 24 Hours drivers
Volkswagen Motorsport drivers